Enough may refer to:

Film and television
Enough (film), a 2002 film starring Jennifer Lopez
"Enough" (CSI: NY), an episode of the TV series
"Enough", an episode of Tru Calling

Songs
"Enough" (Tarja Turunen song), 2009
"Enough" (Delta Goodrem song), 2016
"Enough" (Malina Moye song), 2019
"Enough", by Cat Power from Myra Lee
"Enough", by Chris Tomlin from Not to Us
"Enough", by Default from Elocation
"Enough", by Disturbed from Indestructible
"Enough", by Flume featuring Pusha T from Skin Companion EP 2
"Enough", by Jeremy Camp from Carried Me
"Enough", by Jessica Sierra from Rebound
"Enough", by Keke Wyatt from Unbelievable
"Enough", by Sara Groves from Floodplain
"Enough", by Sevendust from Chapter VII: Hope & Sorrow
"Enough", by Simply Red from A New Flame
"Enough", from the musical In the Heights

Other uses
 Enough Project, an organization founded by John Prendergast and Gayle Smith
 Enough, Missouri, a ghost town in the United States
 Chega (political party) (English: "Enough"), Portugal

See also
Enough Said (disambiguation)
"Enuff", a 2006 song by DJ Shadow